Tutak (also Romanized as Tūtak and Ţūţak) is a village in, and the capital of, Tutak Rural District of Isar District of Marvast County, Yazd province, Iran. At the 2006 National Census, its population was 322 in 89 households. The following census in 2011 counted 325 people in 92 households. The latest census in 2016 showed a population of 420 people in 118 households.

References 

Populated places in Yazd Province